The 2019 FC Atyrau season was the 19th successive season that the club played in the Kazakhstan Premier League, the highest tier of association football in Kazakhstan. They reached the Kazakhstan Cup Final for the third year in succession, losing to FC Kaisar, whilst finishing 11th in the Kazakhstan Premier League, being relegated for the first time.

Season events
On 27 April, Viktor Kumykov left his role as manager of Atyrau by mutual consent, with Kuanysh Kuandulov being appointed as caretaker manager. Oleg Dulub was appointed as the club's permanent manager on 3 May.

Squad

Transfers

In

Released

Competitions

Premier League

Results summary

Results by round

Results

League table

Kazakhstan Cup

Final

Squad statistics

Appearances and goals

|-
|colspan="14"|Players away from Atyrau on loan:
|-
|colspan="14"|Players who left Atyrau during the season:

|}

Goal scorers

Disciplinary record

References

External links
Official Website

FC Atyrau seasons
Atyrau